The Ala I Pannoniorum (Ala I Pannoniorum Sabiniana), was a Roman cavalry military-aux unit stationed in Gemellae in Roman Numidia.

During the third century it was commanded by a former guardsman, Celerinius Augendus, who had been ennobled to the equestrian order and given command of this frontier units, guarding the border facing the Sahara desert.

See also 
 Roman auxiliaries
 List of Roman auxiliary regiments

References

Sources
 Michael P. Speidel - Riding for Caesar, the Roman Emperors' Horse Guards, page 150
 John E. H. Spaul: Ala I Pannoniorum - One or Many In: Zeitschrift für Papyrologie und Epigraphik. Band 105 (1995), S. 63–73, S. 195–196 (PDF S. 5-6)

Cavalry units and formations of ancient Rome